Fabrice Henry (born 13 February 1968 in Argenteuil, Val-d'Oise) is a French former football midfielder who played for various clubs in France, Spain and Scotland throughout the 1980s and 1990s.

Career
Henry started his professional career at FC Sochaux-Montbéliard in 1985, where he played for eight years, before joining Olympique de Marseille in 1993. He never broke into the first team at Marseille, however, and left after just one season to join Nîmes Olympique. He then went on to play for Perpignan Canet FC, Toulouse FC and CD Toledo between 1995 and 1997, when he joined Swiss side FC Basel. 

Henry joined FC Basel's first team for their 1996–97 season under head coach Karl Engel. After playing in six test games Henry played his domestic league debut for his new club in the home game in the St. Jakob Stadium on 2 March 1997 as Basel won 1–0 against Zürich. He scored his first goal for the club on 15 November 1997 in the Swiss Cup game against SC Buochs as Basel won 7–2 after extra time. It was the last goal of the game in the 121 st minute.

Henry stayed with the club for two and a half seasons. Between the years 1997 and 1999 he played a total of 47 games for Basel scoring a total of four goals. 25 of these games were in the Nationalliga A, three in the Swiss Cup and 19 were friendly games. He scored one goal in the domestic league, one in the domestic cup and the other two were scored during the test games.

In July 1999 he signed, on loan for one year from Basel, for Scotland's Hibernian and here he played in nine league games before retiring from his active career in 2000.

References

 http://www.football.ch

1968 births
Living people
Sportspeople from Argenteuil
French footballers
French expatriate footballers
Expatriate footballers in Switzerland
Expatriate footballers in Spain
Expatriate footballers in Scotland
Association football midfielders
Ligue 1 players
Ligue 2 players
Swiss Super League players
Scottish Premier League players
FC Sochaux-Montbéliard players
Olympique de Marseille players
Nîmes Olympique players
Toulouse FC players
Canet Roussillon FC players
CD Toledo players
FC Basel players
Hibernian F.C. players
Footballers from Val-d'Oise